József Varga (born 9 October 1954) is a retired Hungarian international football player.

Career
Born in Budapest, Varga spent most of his career with Budapesti Honvéd, where he was very popular and nicknamed "Kacsa" (duck). He also spent some time playing abroad, notably with for Turkish first division club Denizlispor. Varga finished his professional career at Újpest FC.

He made his debut for the Hungarian national team in 1980, and got 31 caps and 1 goal until 1986. He was a participant at the 1982 and 1986 FIFA World Cups, where Hungary failed to progress from the group stage on both occasions. Varga scored his only international goal against Belgium at the 1982 World Cup.

References

External links
 
 
 

1954 births
Living people
Footballers from Budapest
Hungarian footballers
Hungary international footballers
1982 FIFA World Cup players
1986 FIFA World Cup players
Hungarian expatriate footballers
Expatriate footballers in Turkey
Expatriate footballers in Finland
Hungarian expatriate sportspeople in Turkey
Hungarian expatriate sportspeople in Finland
Újpest FC players
Volán FC players
Reipas Lahti players
Budapest Honvéd FC players
Denizlispor footballers
Süper Lig players
Association football defenders